The CBSCR Bandon Tanks were a class of 4-6-0T mixed-traffic locomotives built for the Cork, Bandon and South Coast Railway (CB&SCR) between 1906 and 1920. The Bandon Tanks were the only 4–6–0 tank locomotives to be built by Beyer, Peacock and Company. The class went on to serve with the CB&SCR's successors: the Great Southern Railways from 1925 and Córas Iompair Éireann from 1945.
 
The Bandon Tanks excelled due to their elegant design, high power output and compact wheel arrangement, which suited the track of the CB&SCR network.

Introduction and CB&SCR service
The 4–6–0T wheel arrangement was more typically found on narrow gauge lines, because the restricted bunker space (and resultant limited coal capacity) is less of a hindrance on the typically shorter journeys of such lines. A 4-6-2T wheel arrangement would have given more bunker space, but it would have been too long for the CB&SCR's turntables. The wheelbase was also short-coupled (close to each other) in order to manage the tight curves on the CB&SCR lines. Each locomotive had capacity for two tons of coal and 1,100 gallons of water and weighed 56 tons 10 hundredweight.

The first member of the class was 11 which was ordered in 1905, cost £3,145 and was delivered in June 1906. The next to be built was 14, which was ordered in 1908, cost £2,575 and was delivered in March 1909. These were followed by 15 in October 1910, 20 in July 1912 and 19 in June 1914.

The CB&SCR ordered no. 4 in April 1915 but First World War restrictions prevented Beyer, Peacock from completing and delivering it until October 1919. The two final members of the class were 8 and 13, which were delivered in November 1920. Post-war inflation had trebled the price of these final two locomotives to £8,163 and £9,163 respectively.

Operationally the Bandon Tanks were small and powerful locomotives, well regarded apart from the cramped cab and the difficulty of cab access due to the rear wheel splashers.

GSR and CIÉ service and withdrawal
The GSR renumbered the class 463 – 470 and later designated it Class B4. Between 1935 and 1947 the GSR rebuilt five of the class with type "R" Belpaire superheated boilers.

In 1939 first 470 and then 466 were also transferred to Grand Canal Street. 469 replaced 466 on the Bray line for just over a year, from 1941 until 1942. 466 became the last Bandon Tank in service on the Bray line, remaining there until September 1956.

465 and 469 were withdrawn in 1945. CIÉ withdrew 467 in 1959. CIÉ withdrew 466, 468 and 470 in 1961, the year that it closed the former CB&SCR network. 463 and 464 stayed in service until 1963, which was CIÉ's final year of steam traction.

Livery
In CB&SCR service the class was painted olive green with yellow lining. Throughout the period of Great Southern Railways operation (1925-45), along with all locomotives on the West Cork system (and further afield), they were all-over unlined dark grey, which was carried over into CIE days. In CIÉ service there was some variation in liveries.
466 was painted lined CIÉ green in December 1948.
467 was a dark blue-green in 1953.
470 was a dark matt off-black (likely to be a local variation of the standard dark grey livery) in 1954 and 463 was the same in 1962.
464 appeared to be gloss black in 1961.
Any others remained dark grey.

Model
A 1:76 scale (OO and 21 mm gauges) nickel-silver kit is available from Studio Scale Models. Both Belpaire and unsaturated versions can be made.

Notes

Bibliography

Beyer, Peacock locomotives
4-6-0T locomotives
Steam locomotives of Ireland
5 ft 3 in gauge locomotives
Railway locomotives introduced in 1906
Scrapped locomotives